Staveley is a surname. Notable people with the surname include:

 Amanda Staveley (born 1973), British businesswoman
 Cecil Staveley (1874–1934), Royal Navy officer, son of Charles Staveley
 Charles Staveley (1817–1896), British general, son of William Staveley
 Lilian Staveley (1871–1928), Christian writer and mystic
 May Staveley (1863–1934), British university teacher and warden 
 Miles Staveley (fl. 1846–1870), English cricketer
 Ralph Staveley (c.1362-c.1420), English lord
 Thomas Staveley (1626-1684), English antiquary, magistrate, and anti-Catholic
 William Staveley (1784–1854), British general
 William Staveley (Royal Navy officer) (1928–1997)